Longstreet is a television movie that served as the pilot for the 1971-1972 ABC television series, Longstreet.

It starred James Franciscus as Mike Longstreet, an insurance investigator in New Orleans who loses his sight and his wife in an explosion and is determined to track down his wife's killers.  The movie ran 90 minutes (with commercial breaks). It filmed partially on-location at the Place D'Armes Hotel in the French Quarter of 
New Orleans.

ABC Movie of the Week
1971 television films
1971 films
Television films as pilots
Films shot in New Orleans